Han Gwang-song (born 17 October 1957) is a North Korean gymnast. He competed in eight events at the 1980 Summer Olympics.

References

1957 births
Living people
North Korean male artistic gymnasts
Olympic gymnasts of North Korea
Gymnasts at the 1980 Summer Olympics
Place of birth missing (living people)
Asian Games medalists in gymnastics
Gymnasts at the 1978 Asian Games
Gymnasts at the 1982 Asian Games
Asian Games bronze medalists for North Korea
Medalists at the 1978 Asian Games
Medalists at the 1982 Asian Games
20th-century North Korean people